The Cedartown Commercial Historic District is a historic district in Cedartown, Georgia. It was listed on the National Register of Historic Places in 1992.

The district includes 65 contributing buildings, one other contributing structure, and a contributing object.  The majority of buildings are one-story and two-story brick commercial buildings on South Main Street that were built from the 1870s to 1942.

See also
National Register of Historic Places listings in Polk County, Georgia

References

Historic districts on the National Register of Historic Places in Georgia (U.S. state)
Buildings and structures in Polk County, Georgia